The 1901 NYU Violets football team was an American football team that represented New York University as an independent during the 1901 college football season. In their first year under head coach W. H. Rorke, the team compiled a 4–3–1 record.

Schedule

References

NYU
NYU Violets football seasons
NYU Violets football